Pyotr Alexeyevich Bryanskikh (1896 – 29 August 1938) was a Soviet komkor (corps commander). He fought in the Imperial Russian Army during World War I before going over to the Bolsheviks during the subsequent civil war. He was a recipient of the Order of the Red Banner. On 20 November 1935 he was made a Komdiv (division commander) before being promoted to Komkor in 1937. He served as deputy commander of the Belorussian Military District before being transferred to command the Volga Military District. During the Great Purge, he was arrested on 18 July 1938 and later executed. After the death of Joseph Stalin, he was rehabilitated on 9 April 1955.

References

 

1896 births
1938 deaths
Bryanskikh
Russian military personnel of World War I
Soviet military personnel of the Russian Civil War
Great Purge victims from Russia
People executed by the Soviet Union
Recipients of the Order of the Red Banner
Soviet rehabilitations